The Col de Latrape (elevation ) is a  mountain pass in the French Pyrenees in the department of Ariège, between the communities of  Aulus-les-Bains (east) and Ustou (west).

Details of climb

Appearances in Tour de France
The Col de Latrape was first used in the Tour de France in 1956, since when it has featured eight times, most recently in 2017, when the leader over the summit was Alessandro De Marchi.

References

Mountain passes of Ariège (department)
Mountain passes of the Pyrenees